"A Little More You" is  a song co-written and recorded by American country music group Little Big Town. It was released in February 2007 as the fourth single from their album The Road to Here.  The song was written by group members Karen Fairchild, Kimberly Roads, Phillip Sweet and Jimi Westbrook with Wayne Kirkpatrick.

Critical reception
Kevin John Coyne of Country Universe gave the song a 'B' grade, writing that it "sounds much cleaner" than their previous singles and "the harmonies are given a chance to really shine."

Music video
The music video was directed by Roger Pistole and premiered in April 2007. It was filmed in Guanacaste, Costa Rica. It features the quartet performing the song in a jungle setting, and various young people hanging out in the same understory, as well as swimming, jumping off a rope, and hanging out by a river at night along with the band.

Chart performance
The song debuted at number 53 on the U.S. Billboard Hot Country Songs chart for the week of March 3, 2007.

References

2007 singles
Little Big Town songs
Equity Music Group singles
Songs written by Karen Fairchild
Songs written by Kimberly Schlapman
Songs written by Phillip Sweet
Songs written by Jimi Westbrook
Songs written by Wayne Kirkpatrick
2005 songs